In biological taxonomy, a domain ( or ) (Latin: regio), also dominion, superkingdom, realm, or empire, is the highest taxonomic rank of all organisms taken together. It was introduced in the three-domain system of taxonomy devised by Carl Woese, Otto Kandler and Mark Wheelis in 1990.

According to the domain system, the tree of life consists of either three domains such as Archaea, Bacteria, and Eukarya, or two domains consisting of Archaea and Bacteria, with Eukarya included in Archaea. The first two are all prokaryotes, single-celled microorganisms without a membrane-bound nucleus. All organisms that have a cell nucleus and other membrane-bound organelles are included in Eukarya and are called eukaryotes.

Non-cellular life is not included in this system. Alternatives to the three-domain system include the earlier two-empire system (with the empires Prokaryota and Eukaryota), and the eocyte hypothesis (with two domains of Bacteria and Archaea, with Eukarya included as a branch of Archaea).

Terminology 
The term domain was proposed by Carl Woese, Otto Kandler, and Mark Wheelis (1990) in a three-domain system. This term represents a synonym for the category of dominion (Lat. dominium), introduced by Moore in 1974.

Development of the Domain System 
Carolus Linnaeus made the classification of domain popular in the famous taxonomy system he created in the middle of the eighteenth century. This system was further improved by the studies of Charles Darwin later on but failed to properly classify the domain, Bacteria, due to it having very few observable features to compare to the other domains. 

Carl Woese made a revolutionary breakthrough when, in 1977, he compared the nucleotide sequences of the 16s ribosomal RNA and discovered that the rank, domain, contained three branches, not two like scientists had previously thought. Initially, due to their physical similarities, Archaea and Bacteria were classified together and called "archaebacteria". However, scientists now know that these two domains are hardly similar and are internally wildly different.

Characteristics of the three domains 

Each of these three domains contains unique ribosomal RNA. This forms the basis of the three-domain system. While the presence of a nuclear membrane differentiates the Eukarya from the Archaea and Bacteria, both of which lack a nuclear envelope, the Archaea and Bacteria are distinct from each other differences in the biochemistry of their cell membranes and RNA markers.

Archaea

Archaea are  prokaryotic cells, typically characterized by membrane lipids that are branched hydrocarbon chains attached to glycerol by ether linkages. The presence of these ether linkages in Archaea adds to their ability to withstand extreme temperatures and highly acidic conditions, but many archaea live in mild environments. Halophiles, organisms that thrive in highly salty environments, and hyperthermophiles, organisms that thrive in extremely hot environments, are examples of Archaea.

Archaea evolved many cell sizes, but all are relatively small. Their size ranges from 0.1 μm to 15 μm diameter and up to 200 μm long. They are about the size of bacteria, or similar in size to the mitochondria found in eukaryotic cells. Members of the genus Thermoplasma are the smallest of the Archaea.

Bacteria

Cyanobacteria and mycoplasmas are two examples of bacteria.
Even though bacteria are prokaryotic cells just like Archaea, their cell membranes are instead made of phospholipid bilayers. 
Bacteria cell membranes are distinct from Archean membranes: They characteristically have none of the ether linkages that Archaea have. Internally, bacteria have different RNA structures in their ribosomes, hence they are grouped into a different category. In the two- and three-domain systems, this puts them into a separate domain.

There is a great deal of diversity in the domain Bacteria. That diversity is further confounded by exchange of genes between different bacterial lineages. The occurrence of duplicate genes between otherwise distantly-related bacteria makes it nearly impossible to distinguish bacterial species, or count the bacterial species on the Earth, or to organize them into a tree-like structure (unless the structure includes cross-connections between branches, making it a "network" instead of a "tree").

Eukarya

Members of the domain Eukarya – called eukaryotes – have membrane-bound organelles (including a nucleus containing genetic material) and are represented by five kingdoms: Plantae, Protozoa, Animalia, Chromista, and Fungi.

Exclusion of viruses and prions

The three-domain system does not include any form of non-cellular life. Stefan Luketa proposed a five-domain system in 2012, adding Prionobiota (acellular and without nucleic acid) and Virusobiota (acellular but with nucleic acid) to the traditional three domains.

Alternative classifications

Alternative classifications of life include:
 The two-empire system or superdomain system, proposed by Mayr (1998), with top-level groupings of Prokaryota (or Monera) and Eukaryota.
 The eocyte hypothesis, proposed by Lake et al. (1984), which posits two domains: Bacteria and Archaea, with Eukaryota included as a subordinate clade branching from Archaea.

See also 
 Biological dark matter
 Neomura, which is the two domains of life of Archaea and Eukaryota
 Phylogenetics
 Protein structure
 Realm (virology), an equivalent rank for non-cellular life
 Systematics

References

External links